Pebble in the Sky is a science fiction novel by American writer Isaac Asimov, published in 1950. This work is his first novel — parts of the Foundation series had appeared from 1942 onwards in magazines, but Foundation was not published in book form until 1951.  The original Foundation books are also a string of linked episodes, whereas this is a complete story involving a single group of characters.

Publication history
Pebble in the Sky was originally written in the summer of 1947 under the title "Grow Old with Me" for Startling Stories, whose editor Sam Merwin, Jr. had approached Asimov to write a forty thousand word short novel for the magazine. The title was an adaption of Robert Browning's Rabbi ben Ezra, the first few lines of which (starting "Grow old along with me! / The best is yet to be...") were included in the final novel. It was rejected by Startling Stories on the basis that the magazine's emphasis was more on adventure than science-heavy fiction (despite the editor inviting Asimov to write the latter as an experiment for the magazine), and again by John W. Campbell, Asimov's usual editor. In 1949, Doubleday editor Walter I. Bradbury accepted the story on the suggestion of Frederik Pohl, on the condition it was expanded to seventy thousand words and the title changed to something more science fiction oriented, and it was published in January 1950 as Pebble in the Sky. "Grow Old With Me" was later published in its original form along with other draft stories in The Alternate Asimovs in 1986.

In Before the Golden Age, Asimov wrote that Pebble in the Sky was influenced by the short story "Proxima Centauri" by Murray Leinster.

The book has been reprinted many times: in 1953 by Galaxy, in 1957 and 1964 by Bantam, in 1958 and 1982 by Corgi as the first British edition, in 1968 by Sidgwick & Jackson in hardcover, in 1969, 1972, 1974 (both paper and hard cover editions) and 1981 by Sphere Science Fiction, in 1971 and 1975 by Fawcett Books, in 1983 by Del Rey Books, in 1986 in hardcover by Grafton and in 1990 again by Doubleday in hardcover; in addition, it was reprinted as part of the Empire series, in 1986 by Ballantine Books, in 1992 by Spectra and in 2010 by Orb Books, in both print and Kindle editions.

Pebble in the Sky was also included in a number of omnibuses: first in 1952 in Triangle along with the others in the Empire series (The Stars, Like Dust and The Currents of Space which had only been published earlier that year), in 1978 in The Far Ends of Time and Earth along with The End of Eternity and the short story collection Earth Is Room Enough, and again with the Empire series novels in 2002 as The Empire Novels.

The book was adapted for radio by Ernest Kinoy for Dimension X as "Pebble in the Sky"; first broadcast in 1951 it was released as an audio download in 2007 by Radio Spirits, and again in 2011.

Story background
The book begins with a retired tailor from the mid-20th century, who is accidentally pitched forward into the future. By then, Earth has become radioactive and is a low-status part of a vast Galactic Empire. There is both a mystery and a power-struggle, and a lot of debate and human choices.  The protagonist is a very ordinary man, rather than the more typical space opera hero.

This book takes place in the same universe as the Foundation series. Earth is part of the Empire of Trantor, later the setting for Hari Seldon's invention of psychohistory. Asimov returned to the radioactive-Earth theme in The Stars, Like Dust; The Currents of Space; and Foundation and Earth. He would explore it most fully in Robots and Empire.

Pebble in the Sky has been grouped along with The Stars, Like Dust and The Currents of Space as the so-called Galactic Empire series. However, these are only loosely connected, occurring between the era of the Spacers and the Foundation series, but not otherwise overlapping in time, location, or theme.

In this work, unlike The End of Eternity, the time travel is one-way and uncontrolled. It is unlikely that the technologies are related, since, according to Andrew Harlan, the energy requirements for transporting a human with the Eternity's technology far exceed the capabilities of twentieth century Earth.

One element of the novel Asimov was particularly fond of was the inclusion of a scene of exposition conducted over the course of a game of chess between two of the characters. By recounting all the moves, Asimov reacted against the common tendency of novelistic portrayals of chess games to neglect the action on the board. The game that he chose to present was a victory by Grigory Levenfish (black) over Boris Verlinsky (white) in Moscow in 1924, one which gained the victor a brilliancy-prize.

Plot summary
While walking down the street in Chicago, Joseph Schwartz, a retired tailor, is the unwitting victim of a nearby nuclear laboratory accident, by means of which he is instantaneously transported tens of thousands of years into the future (50,000 years, by one character's estimate, a figure later retconned by future Asimov works as a "mistake"). He finds himself in a place he does not recognize, and due to apparent changes in the spoken language that far into the future, he is unable to communicate with anyone. He wanders into a farm, and is taken in by the couple that lives there. They mistake him for a mentally deficient person, and they secretly offer him as a subject for an experimental procedure to increase his mental abilities. The procedure, which has killed several subjects, works in his case, and he finds that he can quickly learn to speak the current lingua franca. He also slowly realizes that the procedure has given him strong telepathic abilities, including the ability to project his thoughts to the point of killing or injuring a person.

The Earth, at this time, is seen by the rest of the Galactic Empire as a rebellious planet — it has rebelled three times in the past — and the inhabitants are widely frowned upon and discriminated against. Earth also has several large radioactive areas, although the cause is never really described. With large uninhabitable areas, it is a very poor planet, and anyone who is unable to work is legally required to be euthanized. The people of the Earth must also be executed when they reach the age of sixty, a procedure known as "The Sixty", with very few exceptions; mainly for people who have made significant contributions to society. That is a problem for Schwartz, who is now sixty-two years old.

The Earth is part of the Trantorian Galactic Empire, with a resident Procurator, who lives in a domed town in the high Himalayas and a Galactic military garrison, but in practice it is ruled by a group of Earth-centered "religious fanatics" who believe in the ultimate superiority of Earthlings. They have created a new, deadly supervirus that they plan to use to kill or subjugate the rest of the Empire, and to avenge themselves for the way their planet has been treated by the galaxy at large. Citizens of the Empire are unaware of Earth's lethal viruses, and mistakenly believe it is Earth's environment that causes them "Radiation Fever," and that Earthlings pose the Empire no threat.

Joseph Schwartz, along with Affret Shekt, the scientist who developed the new device that boosted Schwartz's mental powers, his daughter Pola Shekt, and a visiting archaeologist Bel Arvardan, are captured by the rebels, but they escape with the help of Schwartz's new mental abilities, and they are narrowly able to stop the plan to release the virus. Schwartz uses his mental abilities to provoke a pilot from the Imperial garrison into bombing the site where the arsenal of the super-virus exists.

The book ends on a hopeful note — perhaps the Empire can be persuaded to restore the Earth and reintroduce uncontaminated soil.

Reception
Boucher and McComas were disappointed by the novel, saying that despite Asimov's good ideas, "his heavy treatment and routine plot are disappointing. L. Sprague de Camp, however, recommended the novel highly, praising it as "excellent; one of the few really mature and professional jobs available in book form [in 1950]. . . . Asimov's characterization is good, his suspense is almost unbearable, and his handling of the theme of group prejudice is masterful." Galaxy Science Fictions Floyd C. Gale told readers "Don't miss" it and the other Empire novels. Lester del Rey found the novel "a first-rate story."

Place in the wider Foundation saga

Chronology
The 50,000-year estimate is at odds with the chronology given in Asimov's later novels, in particular Foundation and Earth and The Caves of Steel. The latter novel indicates that the robot R. Daneel Olivaw was constructed some three thousand years after the founding of New York City. Foundation and Earth, in its concluding scene, establishes that Daneel survives into the Interregnum period, after the First Galactic Empire collapses. He gives his age as (roughly) twenty thousand years. The Galactic Era dating system, to which most of Asimov's Foundation Series adheres, places Foundation and Earth approximately twelve thousand years after the events of Pebble in the Sky. Adding up all the differences, Joseph Schwartz's time displacement ultimately transported him only some eleven millennia into the future.

In Foundation, the Galactic Empire has existed for 12,000 years. Nuclear power is believed to have existed for 50,000 years, even though this is long after the era of Pebble in the Sky.

Historical analogy

The obvious historical analogy is between Earth in the book and the historical situation of Judea under the Roman Empire, with the fanatics plotting rebellion against Trantor being modeled upon the Zealots who in 66 AD  launched the First Jewish–Roman War which ended with destruction of the Jerusalem Temple, an event of Jewish history. This fits well in the general scheme of Trantor being the equivalent of Rome, and Trantor's later decline in the Foundation Series being the equivalent of Rome's decline centuries after the destruction of Jerusalem. Asimov's position in this ancient historical controversy is clear, with the fanatic rebels being the undoubted villains of the book. It is noteworthy that Joseph Schwartz – the man from the past who ultimately foils the fanatics' plot – is clearly Jewish, and his action in effect saves the people of the future Earth from re-enacting the great tragedy of Schwartz's own people.

The fate of Earth
In Foundation and Earth, it is described  that the Empire began a restoration of Earth, but that this was subsequently abandoned. There are also descendants of the old population at "Alpha," a planet circling one of the suns of Alpha Centauri. They were settled there by the Empire, which intended to make a whole terraformed world, but which ultimately produced just one large island. Janov Pelorat stated that, if he understood the legends of Alpha correctly, the start of the restoration attempt was right before a period of much larger problems for the Empire. Daneel explains that he had a role in attempting the restoration of Earth's soil and also settling humans at "Alpha," but achieved less than he had wanted. Whether he was personally involved in the actual events of Pebble is not discussed, but strongly implied. It is left open that other refugees from Earth might have settled elsewhere in the universe.

Other media
On June 17, 1951, the NBC radio network broadcast a much abbreviated radio dramatization of Pebble in the Sky in the science fiction anthology series Dimension X. In this much abbreviated version (only 25 minutes), the whole story of time travel was cut out with Bel and Pola being the main characters. The ending was quite different, since the virus was released, leaving Earth alone as "a pebble in the sky".

References

External links
 
 
 Pebble in the Sky on the Internet Archive

Foundation universe books
American post-apocalyptic novels
Science fiction novels by Isaac Asimov
1950 American novels
Novels about time travel
1950 science fiction novels
Doubleday (publisher) books
1950 debut novels